Mankhim is the temple of the Kirat (Rai), one of Nepal's most ancient ethnolinguistic groups. This Mankhim is located at Aritar, Sikkim. In the Rai Language This worship is called Sakela.

External links

Retrieved from Sikkimonline on 17 June 2007
Places of Interests in Aritar  -  Mangkhim Dara

Religious buildings and structures in Sikkim